Burnt Wings may refer to one of several films:

 Burnt Wings, 1916 silent British film directed by Walter West
 Burnt Wings, 1920 silent American film directed by Christy Cabanne